Sympistis linda is a species of moth in the family Noctuidae (the owlet moths). It was first described by William Barnes and James Halliday McDunnough in 1913 and it is found in North America.

The MONA or Hodges number for Sympistis linda is 10086.

References

Further reading

 
 
 

linda
Articles created by Qbugbot
Moths described in 1913